Balázs Taróczy (born 9 May 1954) is a retired tennis player from Hungary. The right-hander won 13 singles titles in his career, and achieved a career-high singles ranking of world No. 12 in April 1982.

Tennis career
Taróczy was six times a Hungarian national champion.

One of the game's premier doubles players, Balazs and partner Heinz Günthardt won the 1985 Wimbledon doubles title. Though never especially proficient on the grass, the duo defeated Pat Cash/John Fitzgerald in four sets.

He became the Hungarian No. 1 player in 1973 and was a member of the Hungary Davis Cup team from 1973 to 1985.

Despite playing part-time, still managed to finish top 50 in the doubles world rankings at No. 45 in 1989

From September 1989 to the end of 1990, he was the coach of Goran Ivanišević.

Career finals

Singles: 20 (13 wins, 7 losses)

Doubles: 59 (26 wins, 33 losses)

References

External links

 
 
 

1954 births
Living people
Hungarian male tennis players
Hungarian tennis coaches
Tennis players from Budapest
Grand Slam (tennis) champions in men's doubles
Universiade medalists in tennis
Universiade silver medalists for Hungary
Universiade bronze medalists for Hungary
French Open champions
Wimbledon champions
Medalists at the 1973 Summer Universiade
Medalists at the 1977 Summer Universiade
20th-century Hungarian people
21st-century Hungarian people